Medford High School is a public high school located in the western edge of the Lawrence Estates section of Medford, Massachusetts on the southwest border of the Middlesex Fells Reservation.  Students in the City of Medford may also attend the Medford Vocational-Technical High School on the same site, or the Curtis/Tufts alternative high school in South Medford.

History
The Old High School building was built between 1894 and 1896 with a rear wing including a gym added in 1914 to its location on 22-24 Forest Street near Medford Square.  Additional North and South wings were added in 1929 and 1939 respectively and those wings were the only ones in use following a fire in 1965 until the close of the school in 1971.

The current campus was completed in that year and during the first decade of the 2000s underwent a major renovation in the third phase of the district's three phase school improvement plan. Between 2013 and 2014, Medford High School underwent additional renovation to improve its science labs and reopen its pool.

Race riots occurred in the 1970s and 90s. Dozens of police officers and troopers were sent in riot gear to restore order in the one in 1992.

In 2013, the Medford High School Alumni Association (MHSAA) was founded. The Association serves as a networking bases among all MHS Alumni and works to give back to the MHS community.

Campus
Medford High School shares its campus and building with Medford Vocational-Technical High School in the Lawrence Estates section of Medford and on the southwest border of the Middlesex Fells Reservation. As of 2015, Medford High School students can explore the Fells via the new "Mustang Trail."

The , a supplementary school for Japanese people, holds classes at Medford High. Its weekday offices are in Arlington. The school began circa 1975, and from that point it was held at Medford High.

Curriculum
Most Medford High School students undertake a college preparatory curriculum that includes four classes of English, three classes each of mathematics, social studies, sciences, and for college-prep students, foreign languages, two classes each of physical education, health/wellness, one class of fine arts and one class of media and computer technology.  All students must also complete fifteen hours of community service each year.

Students can choose from sixteen Advanced Placement courses
to earn college credits.

The English department requires two general literature and writing courses, one on American literature and one on world literature, with Shakespeare appearing in three of those courses. Electives include courses in mythology, plays, writing, AP Language and Composition and AP Literature and Composition.  A separate English Language Learners department includes courses for bringing non-native speakers up to fluency.  The social studies core requires a credit in world history, and one in United States history with electives including contemporary issues, psychology, and AP courses in U.S. History, European History, U.S. Government and Politics, and Psychology.  Humanities electives through the occupational offerings department include an Accounting/Computers sequence and Basic Finance.

Medford High School's foreign language offerings include French, Spanish, and Italian as well as courses on the cultures coinciding with those languages.  There are AP electives for French and Spanish.

MHS's science department offers courses in Anatomy and Physiology, Engineering, Environmental Science, and Science Fair Projects. Its AP offerings include Biology, Chemistry, and Physics (C).  Through the math and media and technology departments, computer oriented electives include C++, digital video, and web design.  Math electives include AP Calculus.

The art department includes sequences in ceramics and in sculpture as well as offering AP Studio Art.  Music courses include Band, Jazz Band, Chorus, and Orchestra.

The family and consumer sciences department offers a course sequence in exploring childhood, while the health department provides courses in relationships, lifestyle choices, and transitioning to adulthood.

Extracurricular activities

Athletics
Medford High School is a member of the Massachusetts Interscholastic Athletic Association in the Greater Boston League. Medford High School is best known for its boys and girls soccer teams.

Clubs and publications
Medford High School offers a number of clubs including the Book Club, the National Honor Society, and the MHS Band.  The school's yearbook is assembled by its members and Mustang News recently transitioned from an offline newspaper to an all online format.

Weekend school
The Japanese Language School of Boston (ボストン日本語学校 Bosuton Nihongo Gakkō), a weekend supplementary Japanese school, holds its classes at Medford High, and the school offices are in Arlington. It was established on June 7, 1975. The classes were originally held in the NEC Systems Laboratory but they began to be held at their current location after four months.

Notable alumni

Academics, Authors, Mathematicians, and Scientists
Elliot Quincy Adams, scientist (colorimetry)
Martin Demaine, artist and mathematician
Fannie Farmer, culinary expert and author
Elizabeth Neilson, health educator
Paul Theroux, award-winning author and essayist

Athletes
Frederick M. Ellis, former NCAA football and basketball coach
Jack Garrity, former Olympic ice hockey player
Arantxa King, Bermuda Olympic track and field athlete
Bill Monbouquette, former MLB baseball player
Frank Morrissey, NCAA football player and coach
Mike Pagliarulo, former MLB baseball player
Jim Reid, NCAA football coach
Bill Riley, NCAA ice hockey player
Jack Riley, former NCAA and U.S. Olympic ice hockey coach
Dave Sacco, former NHL ice hockey player
Joe Sacco, former NHL ice hockey player and coach
Eddie Tryon, former NFL football player
Shawn Bates, former NHL ice hockey player

Entertainers
Maria Menounos, actress, journalist, television presenter
Bia, an American rapper and reality television star
Paul Geary, co-founder and drummer of rock band Extreme (band), artist manager

Politicians and Government employees
Michael Bloomberg, New York City Mayor, founder and owner of Bloomberg L.P.
William L. Uanna, security officer, Manhattan Project and U.S. Atomic Energy Commission

Other
 Elizabeth Short, cold case murder victim

Former Principals
 1998–2012 Paul H. Krueger

Notable teachers/faculty
George Stewart Miller - History department head (1912–1916); Acting president of Tufts (1937–1938)

References

External links
 

Schools in Middlesex County, Massachusetts
Public high schools in Massachusetts